Here We Come A-wassailing (or Here We Come A-Caroling), also known as Here We Come A-Christmasing, Wassail Song and by many other names, is a traditional English Christmas carol and New Year song, typically sung whilst wassailing, or singing carols, wishing good health and exchanging gifts door to door. It is listed as number 209 in the Roud Folk Song Index. Gower Wassail and Gloucestershire Wassail are similar wassailing songs.

History and context 
The song dates from at least the mid 19th century, but is probably much older. The a- in "a-wassailing" is an archaic intensifying prefix; compare A-Hunting We Will Go and lyrics to The Twelve Days of Christmas (e.g., "Six geese a-laying").

According to Reader's Digest; "the Christmas spirit often made the rich a little more generous than usual, and bands of beggars and orphans used to dance their way through the snowy streets of England, offering to sing good cheer and to tell good fortune if the householder would give them a drink from his wassail bowl or a penny or a pork pie or, let them stand for a few minutes beside the warmth of his hearth. The wassail bowl itself was a hearty combination of hot ale or beer, apples, spices and mead, just alcoholic enough to warm tingling toes and fingers of the singers."

Variants

In 1949, the Welsh folk singer Phil Tanner sang a minor-key variant called "Wassail Song" and generally known as "Gower Wassail", which was popularised by various folk revival groups.

A variant is "Here We Come A-Christmasing". It replaces the word "wassail" with "Christmas".

There are also other variants (often, but not always, sung by Americans), wherein the first verse is sung "Here we come a-caroling" and it is titled so. Often in this version, the third verse (directly after the first refrain [see lyrics]) is removed, along with the refrain that follows it, but this depends on which version is being used. This version also often has the second line of the chorus "And a merry Christmas too" or "And to you glad tidings too", instead of "And to you your wassail too". There were other different satirical variants used on the 1987 Christmas special "A Claymation Christmas Celebration"

Another variant is entitled "We've Been a While-A-Wandering" and "Yorkshire Wassail Song".

Traditional collected versions 
Hundreds of versions of wassailing songs have been collected, including dozens of variants collected by Cecil Sharp from the 1900s to the 1920s, mostly in the south of England. Many of the traditional versions that have been collected and recorded are not of the "Here We Come A-wassailing" variant; the following examples are similar to the now famous version:

 Emily Bishop of Bromsberrow Heath, Gloucestershire (1952)
 Dorothy Davey of Hull, Yorkshire (1969), available on the British Library Sound Archive website.
 George Dunn of Quarry Bank, Staffordshire (1971), available online via the Vaughan Williams Memorial Library
 Frank Hinchliffe of Sheffield, Yorkshire (1976)

The song appears to have travelled to the United States with English settlers, where it has been found several times in the Appalachian region, and recorded twice:

 Edith Fitzpatrick James of Ashland, Kentucky (1934)
 Jean Ritchie of Viper, Kentucky (1949), available online as part of the Alan Lomax archive.

Lyrics 
As with most carols, there are several related versions of the words. One version is presented below, based on the text given in the New Oxford Book of Carols. The verses are sung in 6/8 time, while the chorus switches to 2/2.

Popular recordings

This song has been performed by:

 The Boston Pops Orchestra under Arthur Fiedler
 Perry Como and the Ray Charles Singers in a medley with "We Wish You a Merry Christmas"
 The Ray Conniff singers
 The Norman Luboff Choir on its 1956 album Songs of Christmas
 Alvin and the Chipmunks on their 1963 album Christmas with The Chipmunks, Vol. 2
 Harry Secombe on his 1966 album My Favourite Carols
 Canadian Brass as an instrumental version on its 1985 album A Canadian Brass Christmas
 The cast of Sesame Street in A Muppet Family Christmas
 The cast of the 1987 Christmas Special A Claymation Christmas Celebration
 The King's Singers on their 1989 album A Little Christmas Music
 The Roches on their 1990 album "We Three Kings"
 Blur recorded an edition in 1992.
 Kate Rusby on her 2008 album Sweet Bells
 The Boy Least Likely To on their 2010 album Christmas Special
 Hawk Nelson on their 2011 album "Hawk Nelson Christmas"
 Blackmore's Night on their 2020 EP "Here We Come A-Caroling"
 The Albion Band have recorded the song on several of their albums

See also
 List of Christmas carols

Notes

British Christmas songs
Christmas carols
English folk songs
New Year songs
Songwriter unknown
Year of song unknown